eGG Network (formerly known as Every Good Game) was a Malaysian/Asean pay television channel that was launched on 7 June 2016. It is a joint venture of Rocketfuel Entertainment Sdn Bhd. This channel focuses on e-sports and broadcasts electronic games tournaments live around the world. Its first tournament broadcast is the International Dota 2 Championships 2015.

The channel ceased transmission on January 23, 2023, and some of the eSports content moved to Astro Arena & Astro Arena 2.

Final programming

Tournaments 
 Counter-Strike: Global Offensive
 ELeague
 PGL Krakòw Major 2017 Asian Minor
 PGL Krakòw Major 2017 CIS Minor
 PGL Krakòw Major 2017 Americas Minor
 PGL Krakòw Major 2017 European Minor
 PGL Krakòw Major 2017
 PGL CS:GO Major 2021
 FIFA
 FIFA Interactive World Cup
 Dota 2
 Boston Major
 The International
 Frankfurt Major
 Shanghai Major
 Manila Major
 Dota 2 Asia Championships
 Kiev Major
 ESL One Genting 2018
 NESO Galaxy Battles
 League of Legends
 World Championship
 League of Legends Champions Korea
 Garena Premier League
 Wild Rift SEA Cup
 Hearthstone
 World Championship
 Heroes of the Storm
 World Championship
 Street Fighter V
 ELEAGUE Street Fighter V Invitational
 Mobile Legends: Bang Bang
 MLBB Southeast Asia Cup
 MLBB M2 World Championship 
 MPL MY/SG Season 8
 MLBB All-Stars
 M4 WORLD Championship 2022
 MPL MY Season 10
 PUBG Mobile
 PUBG Mobile World League East (PMWL 2020)
 PUBG Mobile Global Championship (PMGC 2020)
 PUBG Telur Mata Cup 2021
 PMPL League 2021
 PMPL Fall MY/SG/PH 2022

Original production 
 360
 eGG Scramble
 Generasi Gamerz
 Jalur 14
 360: Stay Home
 Arena eSport
 Dari Hati 2022
 Dongibab
 Gemilang Bersama eGG (Merdeka National Day Special 2022)

References

External links

Astro Malaysia Holdings television channels
Television stations in Malaysia
Television channels and stations established in 2015
2015 establishments in Malaysia
Television channels and stations disestablished in 2023